Richard Burrows (17 October 1941 – 15 December 2022) was an Australian rules footballer who played with Richmond in the Victorian Football League (VFL).

Notes

External links 
		

2022 deaths
1941 births
Australian rules footballers from Victoria (Australia)
Richmond Football Club players
Greensborough Football Club players